Mak Chai-kwong GBS, JP (born 16 June 1950) is a Hong Kong civil engineer and civil servant. He served as Permanent Secretary for Development (Works) from 2006 to 2010.

In 2012, he was appointed as Secretary for Development in the inaugural cabinet of C.Y. Leung, but resigned 12 days later in response of allegations of corruption in the 1980s, making him the shortest-serving cabinet minister in the history of Hong Kong. He was eventually acquitted in 2016.

Background
Mak studied in St. Joan of Arc Secondary School in Hong Kong. In 1973, Mak graduated from University of Hong Kong with a degree in civil engineering. He is current a fellow and senior member of many organizations including the Institution of Civil Engineers, Hong Kong Institution of Engineers, the Hong Kong Institution of Highways and Transportation, Chartered Institute of Logistics and Transport, and the China Hong Kong Railway Institution.

He began his government career in 1973. In 1976 he was an assistant engineer involved in many KCR projects.  In 1994, he was promoted to Chief Engineer, and by 1997, he began serving as Government Engineer. In 2000, he became Principal Government Engineer, which put him in charge of development projects in eastern New Territories, Tseung Kwan O, Sha Tin and Ma On Shan.

By 2002, Mak was Director of Highways in Hong Kong. In 2006, he became the Permanent Secretary for the Environment, Transport and Works (Works), which post became Permanent Secretary for Development (Works) in 2007.  In 2010, Mak retired from the civil service, but he continued to serve in Sichuan Reconstruction Team as team leader for the Development Bureau.

Secretary for Development, and ICAC charge
Mak returned from retirement in July 2012 when he was appointed Secretary for Development in the inaugural government line-up of Chief Executive CY Leung.

Revelations immediately surfaced about a cross-leasing scam in which Mak allegedly fraudulently claimed housing allowance for five years from 1985, while a civil servant. The incident led to his arrest by the ICAC and his resignation on 12 July 2012, twelve days into his appointment. On 17 October, Mak was formally charged, jointly with assistant highways director Tsang King-man, with conspiring to defraud the government, to the personal benefit of HK$445,000. He was acquitted by the Court of Final Appeal in 2016.

Mak was replaced as Secretary for Development by Paul Chan, a former lawmaker in the Accountancy functional constituency.

Honours
In 2010, Mak was awarded the Gold Bauhinia Star.

References

Government officials of Hong Kong
Hong Kong civil servants
1950 births
Living people
Members of the Election Committee of Hong Kong, 2012–2017